Boudinotiana is a genus of geometrid moths in the family Geometridae. There are at least four described species in Boudinotiana.

Species
These four species belong to the genus Boudinotiana:
 Boudinotiana hodeberti Leraut, 2002
 Boudinotiana notha (Hubner, 1803)
 Boudinotiana puella (Esper, 1787)
 Boudinotiana touranginii (Berce, 1870)

References

Further reading

 
 
 
 
 

Archiearinae
Articles created by Qbugbot